The 1969–70 UC Irvine Anteaters men's basketball team represented the University of California, Irvine during the 1969–70 NCAA College Division men's basketball season. The Anteaters were led by first year head coach Tim Tift and played their home games at Crawford Hall. The anteaters finished the season with a record 17–9.

Previous season
The 1967–68 UC Irvine Anteaters finished with a record of 19–9 under second year coach Dick Davis. The anteaters finished the season with a record 19–9. At the end of the season, head coach Dick Davis accepted the head coach position at San Diego State and frosh coach Tim Tift was promoted to replace him as the anteater's head coach.

Roster

Schedule

|-
!colspan=9 style=|Regular Season

Source

References

UC Irvine Anteaters men's basketball seasons
UC Irvine Anteaters
UC Irvine Anteaters